Gary Andrew Porter, Baron Porter of Spalding  is a British Conservative politician, local government leader, member of the House of Lords and a South Holland (Lincolnshire) district councillor, who was elected unopposed as Chair of the Local Government Association in June 2015. He has been the leader of South Holland District Council since 2003. Nominated for a life peerage in August 2015, he was created Baron Porter of Spalding, of Spalding in the County of Lincolnshire on 15 October 2015.

He was educated at De Montfort University (BA, 2000) and Canterbury Christ Church University (Postgraduate Certificate, 2011).

References

Living people
Alumni of De Montfort University
Commanders of the Order of the British Empire
Conservative Party (UK) life peers
Life peers created by Elizabeth II
1960 births
Chairs of the Local Government Association